The Azerbaijan Communist Party was the ruling political party in the Azerbaijan SSR, making it effectively a branch of the Communist Party of the Soviet Union. It was formed on 20 February 1920, when the Muslim Social Democratic Party, Communist Party of Persia, Ahrar Party and the Baku Bolsheviks joined together to establish the Communist Party of Azerbaijan. On 1 April of the same year, the Fifth Cabinet of Ministers of the Azerbaijan Democratic Republic gave its resignations and all the power to the Communist Party of Azerbaijan. The party ruled the Azerbaijan SSR until 14 September 1991 when it was formally disbanded. Nevertheless, former leaders and members of the communists continued to play a role in the family- and patronage-based political system. The Communist Party of Azerbaijan won the first multi-party elections in Azerbaijan that took place on 30 September and 14 October 1990 for the Supreme Soviet, obtaining 280 out of 360 seats.

First secretaries of the Communist Party of Azerbaijan

Notable people 
 

Valery Grigoryan, former party chairman

Notes

References 

Azerbaijan
Communist parties in Azerbaijan
Defunct political parties in Azerbaijan
Political parties established in 1920
Political parties disestablished in 1991
Parties of one-party systems
1920 establishments in Azerbaijan
Communist parties in the Soviet Union
Azerbaijan Soviet Socialist Republic
Political parties of the Russian Revolution
1991 disestablishments in Azerbaijan